Čeluga is a settlement in the municipality of Bar, Montenegro. It is located approximately four kilometers from the city of Bar.

According to the 2011 census, its population was 1,481.

Demographics
Population of Čeluga:

References

Populated places in Bar Municipality